Robert Miles (born 21 August 1976) is an Australian former professional rugby league footballer who played in 1990s and 2000s, he played in the National Rugby League (NRL) for the Sydney City Roosters, Northern Eagles and the Wests Tigers.

Background
Robert Miles was born in Sydney, New South Wales, Australia.

Playing career
Miles made his first grade debut for Eastern Suburbs, now known as the "Sydney Roosters" in Round 1 1997 against South Queensland. Miles spent 4 years at the club before joining the now defunct Northern Eagles in 2001. Miles played in the club's last ever game which was a 68-28 loss against Penrith with Miles scoring a try in the match. In 2003, Miles joined Wests Tigers and played 3 seasons with the club including being a part of the winning 2004 Rugby League World Sevens side. Miles retired at the end of 2005.

References

1976 births
Australian rugby league players
Living people
Northern Eagles players
Rugby league centres
Rugby league players from Sydney
Rugby league wingers
Sydney Roosters players
Wests Tigers players